Private Richard Henry Burton VC (29 January 1923 – 11 July 1993) was an English recipient of the Victoria Cross, the highest and most prestigious award for gallantry in the face of the enemy that can be awarded to British and Commonwealth forces.

Details
Burton was 21 years old and a private in the 1st Battalion, Duke of Wellington's Regiment, British Army, during the Second World War at Monte Ceco, near Palazzuolo sul Senio, north-east of Florence when the following deed took place. It was for this that he was awarded the Victoria Cross.

The Citation reads:

Further information
Burton was born in Melton Mowbray, Leicestershire where he worked as a bricklayer. He moved to Scotland in later life. He achieved the rank of corporal.

The medal
The medal is on display in the Lord Ashcroft Gallery, Imperial War Museum, London.

References

British VCs of World War 2 (John Laffin, 1997)
Monuments to Courage (David Harvey, 1999)
The Register of the Victoria Cross (This England, 1997)
Scotland's Forgotten Valour (Graham Ross, 1995)

External links
The Independent obituary
Location of grave and VC medal (Tayside)

1923 births
1993 deaths
Burials in Scotland
Military personnel from Leicestershire
People from Melton Mowbray
British Army personnel of World War II
Duke of Wellington's Regiment soldiers
British World War II recipients of the Victoria Cross
British Army recipients of the Victoria Cross